Financial Services Commission or FSC may refer to:
 Financial Services Commission of Mauritius
 British Virgin Islands Financial Services Commission
 Financial Services Commission of Ontario
 Financial Services Commission (South Korea)
 Guernsey Financial Services Commission
 Anguilla Financial Services Commission